Razack Adeyemi Adeola (born January 30, 1959) is a Nigerian banker notable for winning the 2014 Business Day (Nigeria) Outstanding CEO Award and the 2015 The Sun (Nigeria) Banker of the Year.

Early life 
Adeola's tertiary education was at Obafemi Awolowo University where he graduated with a law degree in 1982. In 1983, he was called to the Nigerian Bar. He later went to the University of Lagos where he enrolled as a postgraduate student for a law degree and specialized in the Law of Secured Credit, Comparative Company Law and International Economic Law.

References 

1959 births
Living people
Nigerian Business Executives
Obafemi Awolowo University alumni
University of Lagos alumni